Jerónimo López Ramírez (born 1972), known as Dr Lakra, is a Mexican artist and tattooist based in Oaxaca. Apart from tattooing, his art involves embellishing found images and objects—for instance, dolls, old medical illustrations, and pictures in 1950s Mexican magazines—with macabre or tattoo-style designs.

He has shown work internationally in exhibitions including Stolen Bike at the Andrew Kreps Gallery in New York City, Los Dos Amigos at MACO in Mexico, Pin Up at Tate Modern and Pierced Hearts and True Love at The Drawing Center in New York. In 2008 he participated in the Goth: Reality of the Departed World exhibition at the Yokohama Museum of Art, curated by Eriko Kimura.

He is the son of the graphic artist Francisco Toledo and Elisa Ramírez Castañeda, a Mexican anthropologist and poet. He is also the brother of Natalia Toledo (poet) and Laureana Toledo (artist).

In 2007, he co-produced the book Los Dos Amigos'''with artist Abraham Cruzvillegas.

His works are held in the collections of the Museum of Modern Art, the Hammer Museum and the Walker Art Center.

Exhibitions/projects

 1989 Dr Lakra, Galería El Juglar, Mexico City, Mexico
 1990 Dr Lakra, Galería Caracas, Berlin
 1991 Dr Lakra, Café Primo, Berlin
 1993 Dr Lakra, Kunsthaus Tacheles, Berlin
 1998 Dr Lakra, Juárez 65, Mexico City, Mexico
 2003 Dr Lakra, Kate MacGarry, London
 2005 Los Dos Amigos, Dr. Lakra & Abraham Cruzvillegas, Museo de Arte Contemporáneo de Oaxaca (MACO), Mexico
 2006 Dr Lakra, Kate MacGarry
 2009 Dr Lakra, kurimanzutto
 2009 Modern Ruins'', Kate MacGarry
 2010 Dr Lakra, The Institute of Contemporary Art (ICA), Boston, MA
 2011 Dr Lakra, Amparo Museum (museo Amparo), Puebla, Puebla, Mexico.
 2011 Dr Lakra, Museo de Arte Contemporaneo de Monterrey (MARCO) Monterrey, Nuevo León, Mexico.
 2012 Mexican Demons and Dancing Skeletons, Holstebro Art Museum, Denmark

References

Tattoo artists
Mexican contemporary artists
1972 births
Living people
People from Oaxaca